Zone League East is the fourth-highest football league in Serbia. The league is operated by the Football Association of Eastern Serbia Region.

The league consists of 16 clubs that play each other in a double round-robin league, with each club playing the other clubs at both home and away games. At the end of the season the top club will be promoted to Serbian League East.

Winners

External links
 Football Association of Eastern Serbia Region - Official Site

References

East